Mário Haberfeld (born January 25, 1976 in São Paulo) is a Brazilian auto racing driver.

After winning the British Formula 3 Championship in 1998, he drove in Formula 3000 from 1999 until 2002.  He posted some decent results, but struggled his first season driving for the McLaren junior team failing to score a single point while teammate Nick Heidfeld won the series championship.

Haberfeld also tested for a number of Formula One teams, including Stewart Grand Prix in 1998, McLaren in 1999 and Jordan in 2001.

In 2003 he moved to the Champ Car World Series driving for Mi-Jack Conquest Racing.  His team shared information with a fellow rookie team driving a Reynard chassis, Emerson Fittipaldi's team with future F1 driver Tiago Monteiro.  He scored a best finish of 4th his first start in St. Petersburg.  In 2004 he was a field-filler driving the lone Reynard in the series for Derrick Walker, but proved his worth with another pair of top-five finishes.  No one picked him up for 2005, but he drove a few Grand-Am races for Tuttle Team Racing at the end of the year. He then drove in the Rolex Grand Am series for Adrian Fernández who was also his teammate.

In 2019 Haberfeld raced in the Jaguar I-Pace eTrophy, for Jaguar Brazil Racing, temporarily replacing Cacá Bueno.

Racing record

Career summary

Complete International Formula 3000 results
(key) (Races in bold indicate pole position; races in italics indicate fastest lap.)

Complete Champ Car World Series results
(key)

 ^ New points system implemented in 2004

Complete Jaguar I-Pace eTrophy results
(key) (Races in bold indicate pole position)

References

External links
Driver DB Profile

1976 births
Champ Car drivers
Brazilian Jews
Living people
British Formula Three Championship drivers
Rolex Sports Car Series drivers
Brazilian racing drivers
International Formula 3000 drivers
Formula Ford drivers
European Le Mans Series drivers
Jewish sportspeople
West Competition drivers
Fortec Motorsport drivers
Super Nova Racing drivers
Team Astromega drivers
Walker Racing drivers
Conquest Racing drivers
Paul Stewart Racing drivers